The Men's Association football competition at the 2001 Central American Games took place from 22 November to 2 December at the Estadio Mateo Flores in Guatemala City. This was the seventh Football edition since 1973.

Teams

Venue

Men's tournament

Group A

Group B

Final Group

Women's tournament
The women's football competition at the 2001 Central American Games was divided into two groups of three teams, advancing the top-2 to the semifinals. Unlike the men's tournament that only accepted U-21 players, the women's used their senior squads.

Group A

Group B

Semifinals

Third place

Final

Medals

External links
 RSSSF.com – Juegos Centroamericanos 2001 (Guatemala)

2001
Cen
2001
2001 Central American Games